New Invention may refer to:

New Invention, Shropshire, a village in South Shropshire, England.
New Invention, Willenhall, a suburban village of Willenhall in the Metropolitan Borough of Walsall, England.